Göran Andersson (born 14 February 1956) is a sailor from Sweden, who represented his country at the 1980 Summer Olympics in Tallinn, as crew member in the Soling. With helmsman Jan Andersson and fellow crew member Bertil Larsson they took the 8th place.

References

Living people
1956 births
Sailors at the 1980 Summer Olympics – Soling
Olympic sailors of Sweden
People from Älvdalen Municipality
Swedish male sailors (sport)
Sportspeople from Dalarna County